The Vespasian Psalter (London, British Library, Cotton Vespasian A I) is an Anglo-Saxon illuminated psalter decorated in a partly Insular style produced in the second or third quarter of the 8th century.  It contains an interlinear gloss in Old English which is the oldest extant English translation of any portion of the Bible.  It was produced in southern England, perhaps in St. Augustine's Abbey or Christ Church, Canterbury or Minster-in-Thanet, and is the earliest illuminated manuscript produced in "Southumbria" to survive.

The Psalter belongs to a group of manuscripts from Southern England known as the Tiberius group, also including the Stockholm Codex Aureus, Barberini Gospels, the Book of Cerne, the Tiberius Bede, and the Book of Nunnaminster.

Description
The psalter contains the Book of Psalms together with letters of St. Jerome, hymns and canticles. The main scribe was also the artist of the miniatures.  It was written in Latin on vellum, using a southern English Uncial script with Rustic Capital rubrics.  There were additions made by a scribe named Eadui Basan in an English Carolingian minuscule.  The English gloss was written in a Southumbrian pointed minuscule.

The codex is 235 by 180 mm. The text is written in an area of about 175 by 135 mm.  There are 160 folios.

There are several major initials which are historiated, zoomorphic, or decorated.  Major initials are found at the beginning of Psalms 1, 51 and 101. This tripartite division is typical of Insular Psalters.  In addition, the psalms beginning each of the liturgical divisions of the Psalter are given major initials.  The beginning letters of the other Psalms have smaller "minor" initials which are decorated or zoomorphic and are done in what is called the "antenna" style.  

The only surviving full-page miniature shows King David with his court musicians, and is now folio 30 verso.  It is possible that this miniature was originally the frontispiece or opening miniature of the psalter, and that a decorated incipit page at the start of the Psalms is missing, as well as a carpet page at the end.  Sir Robert Cotton pasted a cutting from the Breviary of Margaret of York on folio 160 verso.  He also inserted a miniature from a 13th-century liturgical psalter as folio 1.

History
The manuscript was produced during the second quarter of the 8th century, and probably the earliest of the Tiberius group.  The script of the Old English gloss is typical of the script produced in Canterbury scriptoria from about 820 to 850.  Eadui Basan, who made additions to the manuscript, was a monk at Christ Church, Canterbury during the early 11th century.  Thomas of Elmham recorded a Psalter at Canterbury which may have been the Vespasian Psalter.

The manuscript was at Canterbury in 1553.  By 1556 it was owned by Sir William Cecil, who lent it to Matthew Parker, Archbishop of Canterbury.  By 1599 it was the possession of Sir Robert Cotton, who signed it on folio 12 recto.  It became national property, along with the rest of the Cotton library in 1702 and was incorporated into the British Museum when it was founded in 1753.  The volume was the first in the Vespasian shelf section in the part of the library indexed by the names from a set of busts of the Roman Emperors on top of the shelves.

Its current binding, with metal clasps, was provided by Cotton.

Notes

References
Brown, Michelle P., in Webster, Leslie E. and Backhouse, Janet M. eds., The Making of England, BM/BL exhibition catalogue (London, 1991), no.153 (see also no.171 etc).
De Hamel, Christopher. A History of Illuminated Manuscripts. Boston: David R. Godine, 1986.
Wilson, David M.; Anglo-Saxon Art: From The Seventh Century To The Norman Conquest, Thames and Hudson (US edn. Overlook Press),  1984.

Further reading 
Alexander, J. J. G. Insular Manuscripts, 6th to the 9th century (Survey of Manuscripts Illuminated in the British Isles), (Harvey Miller, London, 1978), no.29.
Brown, M. P., The Book of Cerne (London and Toronto, 1996), pp. 20–23, 69-73, 120-129 and passim.
Brown, M. P. "Female Book-Ownership and Production in Anglo-Saxon England: the Evidence of the Ninth-Century Prayerbooks." Lexis and Texts in Early English: Studies Presented to Jane Roberts, ed. C. J. Kay and L. M. Sylvester, (Amsterdam/Atlanta, 2001), pp. 45–67.
Brown, M. P. A Guide to Western Historical Scripts from Antiquity to 1600 (London, 1990), pl.17.
Bruce-Mitford, R. L. S. “The Reception by the Anglo-Saxons of Mediterranean Art following their conversion from Ireland and Rome.” Settimane di studio del Centro italiano di studi sull’alto medioevo Spoleto 14 (1967) pp. 822–825.
Gneuss, H. Handlist of Anglo-Saxon Manuscripts: A List of Manuscripts and Manuscript Fragments Written or Owned in England up to 1100 (Tempe, Arizona, 2001), no.381.
Gneuss, H. "A preliminary list of manuscripts written or owned in England up to 1100." Anglo-Saxon England 9, ed. P. Clemoes (Cambridge, 1981), no.381.
James, M. R. The Ancient Libraries of Canterbury and Dover (Cambridge, 1903), pp.lxv-lxvi, 501.
Kendrick, T. D. Anglo-Saxon Art to A.D. 900 (London, 1938), pp. 159 ff., 181.
Ker, N. R. Catalogue of Manuscripts Containing Anglo-Saxon (Oxford, 1957), no.203.
Kuhn, S. M. "From Canterbury to Lichfield," Speculum 23 (1948), pp. 591–629.
Kuhn, S. M. The Vespasian Psalter (Ann Arbor, MI, 1965).
Kuhn, S. M. "The Vespasian Psalter and the Old English Charter Hands" in: Speculum; 18 (1943), pp. 458–483.
Lowe, E. A. Codices latini antiquiores (1934–1971), vol. 2, no. 193.
Nordenfalk, C. Celtic and Anglo-Saxon painting. Book Illumination in the British Isles 600-800 (New York, 1976), p. 95.
Sisam, K. "Cynewulf and his Poetry" in: Proceedings of the British Academy; 18 (1932)
Sweet, H., ed. The Oldest English Texts. Glossaries, the Vespasian Psalter, and other works written before A.D. 900. Early English Text Society (London, 1885).
Temple, E. Anglo-Saxon Manuscripts 900-1066 (Survey of Manuscripts Illuminated in the British Isles), (Harvey Miller: London, 1976), no.55.
Turner, D. Illuminated Manuscripts Exhibited in the Grenville Library (London, 1967), no.13 (for f.1).
Wright, D. H. The Vespasian Psalter (Early English Manuscripts in Facsimile, XIV), 1967.
Zimmermann, E. H. Vorkarolingische Miniaturen (Berlin, 1916), esp. pp. 120, 131, 133-134, 289-291.

External links 
British Library Digitised Manuscript Page
Transcript of the Vespasian Psalter (Old English with parallel Latin), on pages 188-421
More information at Earlier Latin Manuscripts

Illuminated psalters
Hiberno-Saxon manuscripts
8th-century biblical manuscripts
Bible translations into English
Cotton Library
8th-century illuminated manuscripts